KSPB (91.9 FM) is a radio station broadcasting a Variety format. Licensed to Pebble Beach, California, United States, the station serves the Monterey Peninsula, Salinas and Santa Cruz areas.  The station is currently owned by Stevenson School (formerly known as Robert Louis Stevenson School) and features programing from Public Radio International. Operating for more than fifty years, in some form since 1966, the station plays primarily student-selected music historically known as alternative, modern, or college rock.  Outside of student programming hours, the station broadcasts BBC World Service news programming plus Climate One from the Commonwealth Club of California broadcasts on weekend mornings. KSPB has listeners in five counties in California - Monterey, Santa Cruz, San Benito, Santa Clara, San Mateo - with a potential total listenership of more than 1 million. With a fan base spanning from Monterey to Santa Cruz, KSPB is one of the largest high school radio stations in the United States.  A live Internet stream is available on the station's website.  Every year, KSPB also presents live broadcasts of various local sporting events.

Music and programming
At the core of KSPB is its student run programming which airs every day. Because each student disc jockey chooses the genre of music for their specific show, music programming is as diverse as the DJs, but tends to stay hip and contemporary. When student programming is not available, the station rotates broadcasting from the BBC World Service and Climate One at the Commonwealth Club of California.

Student management and academic component
The station is student-run and includes staff positions, from web master to program director. Before applying for a live show on air, each student is required to take a class to learn about Federal Communications Commission (FCC) regulations, and how to operate the station independently.

Awards
KSPB, its faculty, and student disc jockeys have received several awards throughout the stations history. Most recently the station was recognized by the Monterey County Weekly in its "Best of 2011 - Editor's Picks" in the category of "Best Evidence That The Kids Are Alright."

References

External links

SPB
High school radio stations in the United States
Radio stations established in 1979
1979 establishments in California